The Estadio Campeones del 36 is a multi-use stadium in Sullana, Peru. It is used by the football team Alianza Atlético. The stadium holds 12,000 people and was built in 2000. It is a small stadium which was expanded.

The venue name, Champions of 1936, is misleading. No Peruvian League was actually played in 1936 as the national team was preparing itself to compete in the 1936 Summer Olympics in Germany. Alianza Atlético did, however, win a Campeonato Nacional de Fútbol (representing their home region, Piura) governed by the Peruvian Football Federation, and the name stuck despite not being recognized officially as national champions thereafter.

The venue was remodeled and re-inaugurated in 2018 with an enlarged capacity of 12,000.

External links
World Stadiums

Campeones del 36
Alianza Atlético
Buildings and structures in Piura Region